Fillongley is a village and civil parish in the North Warwickshire district of Warwickshire in England. The village is centred on the crossroads of the B4102 (which connects Solihull and Nuneaton) and the B4098 (connecting Coventry and Tamworth). The population of the parish taken at the 2011 census was 1,484. It is situated 5.5 miles (8.8 km) east of Bedworth, 6.5 miles (10.5 km) southwest of Nuneaton and an equal distance northwest of Coventry. Fillongley is further from the sea than any other settlement in Great Britain, being 120 km from the nearest coast.

History
In medieval times, there were two castles. These might not have existed at the same time, and neither survived into the 16th century. The earliest was a ring earthwork of King Stephen's time. The second was probably a fortified manor house, held by the de Hastings family. Henry de Hastings (c.1235–c.1268) was Constable of Kenilworth Castle in 1265-1266 for Simon de Montford during the latter's conflict with King Henry III. In February 1300/1 his son John Hastings (1262-1313), Baron Bergavenny, had licence to crenellate his "manor and town of Fillongley in Warwickshire". He was buried at the Greyfriars in Coventry. The manor house was still standing during the reign of Edward III (1327-1377), but was unoccupied by the de Hastings. It later passed to the Beauchamp family holding the Earl of Warwick title.

Church

The parish church of St Mary and All Saints dates from the 12th century but the tower was a later addition. Inside are examples of 14th-century stained glass. Among the graves is that of Isaac Pearson, the uncle of the Victorian novelist George Eliot, who lived in Arbury nearby.

References

External links

The Birmingham and Midland Society for genealogy and heraldry
Fillongley Parish Council

Villages in Warwickshire